The United States Senate election of 1938 in New York was held on November 8, 1938. Incumbent Democratic Senator Robert F. Wagner was re-elected to a third term over Republican John Lord O'Brian.

General election

Candidates
 Herman J. Hahn (Socialist)
 John Lord O'Brian, attorney and former State Assemblyman (Republican and Independent Progressive)
 O. Martin Olson (Socialist Labor)
 Robert F. Wagner, incumbent Senator (American Labor and Democratic)

Results

References

1938
New York
United States Senate